The Punjab Banking Company (1889) was a bank founded in the year 1889 in British India. The bank became defunct in the year 1916, when it was acquired by the Alliance Bank of Simla.

History

Founding  

The Punjab Banking Company was founded by Sir David Parkes Masson in the year 1889.

The bank's customers were located in the Punjab province of British India.

Management 

The bank was staffed by mostly British nationals who were drawn mainly from the East India Company.

The bank was headquartered in Lahore city in the Punjab province.

Final years 

The bank had branches in Abbotabad, Dalhousie, Ferozepore, Jullundar, Karachi, Cantonment [sic], Multan, Naushera (in the North-west Frontier province), Quetta, Peshawar, Sialkot, Simla, and Srinagar.

In 1916, the bank was finally merged with the Alliance Bank of Simla.

Legacy 

The bank is notable for being the one of the oldest banks in India.

The bank is also notable for being one of the precursors of the State Bank of India, through its predecessor the Alliance Bank of Simla.

See also

Indian banking
List of banks in India

References

External links
 Official Website
 History of the Bank

Defunct banks of India
Companies based in Lahore
Banks established in 1889